Goat Days (original Malayalam title: ആടുജീവിതം (Aadujeevitham)) is a 2008 Malayalam-language novel by Indian author Benyamin. It is about an abused Malayali migrant worker employed in Saudi Arabia as a goatherd against his will.

The novel is based on real-life events and was a best seller in Kerala. According to media, Benyamin became an "overnight sensation" with the publication of this "hard-hitting story" and is currently one of the top sellers in Malayalam. The original Malayalam version of Goat Days has gone through over 100 reprints.

The novel depicts the life of Najeeb Muhammed, an Indian emigrant going missing in Saudi Arabia. Najeeb's dream was to work in the Persian Gulf states and earn enough money to send back home. But, he achieves his dream only to be propelled by a series of incidents into a slavelike existence herding goats in the middle of the Saudi desert. In the end, Najeeb contrives a hazardous scheme to escape his desert prison. Penguin Books India's introduction describes the novel as "the strange and bitter comedy of Najeeb’s life in the desert" and "a universal tale of loneliness and alienation".

The English translation of the novel appeared in the long list of Man Asian Literary Prize 2012 and in the short list of the DSC Prize for South Asian Literature 2013. It also won the Kerala Literary Academy Award for Benyamin in 2009. The book is banned in the United Arab Emirates and Saudi Arabia.

Plot 
The book is divided into four parts (Prison, Desert, Escape and Refuge).

Najeeb Muhammad, a young man from Arattupuzha in Haripad of the Kerala state, is newly married and dreams of a better work in any of the Persian Gulf states. After several endeavors, he finally gets an opportunity to work in Saudi Arabia. However, at the King Khalid International Airport, Riyadh he is clueless as what to do next and is taken away by an Arab man who he believes to be his Arbab. The Arbab takes him to a cattle farm in the middle of a desert, confirming Najeeb's worst nightmare. The Arbab hands Najeeb over to the farm supervisor.

Najeeb is then used as a slave laborer and shepherd and is assigned to tend goats, sheep and camels for almost three and half years in the remote deserts of Saudi Arabia. He is forced to do backbreaking work, kept half-hungry and is denied water to wash and suffers unimaginably. The farm's brutal supervisor keeps Najeeb in control with a gun and binoculars and frequently beats him with a belt. And now Najeeb had to manage this new fate without the bare human essentials.

In a country where he doesn't know the language, places or people, he is far away from any human interaction. Najeeb steadily starts to identify himself with the goats. He considers himself as one of them. His dreams, desires, avenges and hopes starts to fade away as his mindset has now become similar to that of the goats. He talks to them, eats with them, sleeps with them and virtually lives the life of a goat. Although he has tried absconding multiple times, the supervisor catches him every time and punishes him by denying him food and water. He stops absconding when he finds the skeleton of the previous shepherd buried in the sand, who he thought had escaped. Even then, he keeps a ray of hope which will bring freedom and end to his sufferings some day.

Finally one night with the help of Ibrahim Khadiri, a Somalian worker in the neighboring farm, Najeeb Muhammed and his friend Hakeem escapes from the horrible life to freedom. But, the trio fumbles across the desert for days, and young Hakeem dies of thirst and fatigue. But Ibrahim Khadiri and Najeeb keep moving on and the stumble across an Oasis where they manage to take rest for a few days. In the day they had planned to start moving again, Ibrahim disappears leaving Najeeb alone. Initially devastated, Najeeb somehow manages to find his way to a nearby highway, where after a day of trying, a kind Arab stops for him and rides him to Al-Bathaa.

Over there, he meets Kunjikka, a fellow malayali who helps refugees. Kunjikka nurses him back to health and finally calls back to his hometown. Once Najeeb started feeling better, he gets himself arrested by the civil police in order to get deported to India with Hameed, who he had met while being with Kunjikka. Najeeb gets detained in the Sumesi Prison, where arbabs get to visit and take any of the absconded prisoners that worked for them back to their company. Initially Najeeb and Hameed were afraid of their arbabs showing up, but they were detained for months without any issue, until Hameed's arbab appeared and took Hameed away with him. Soon enough, Najeeb's arbab walked in but amazingly he doesn't take Najeeb with him. Relieved, Najeeb thinks that the arbab didn't recognize him until a friendly warden tells him that the arbab didn't have Najeeb's visa, else he would have dragged Najeeb back to the cattle farm. Najeeb realizes that he was kidnapped at the airport and used as a slave, while the visa was for some other job at some other company.

In a few weeks, he gets to know that he is being deported to India by the Saudi Arabian authorities. Feeling ecstatic he bids his goodbye's to his fellow inmates and as he boards the plane with several deportees, he realizes how everyone is being herded inside the plane like a couple goats and how he has lived a goats life.

Main characters 

Najeeb Muhammed (Prisoner Number 13858 at Sumesi Prison, Saudi Arabia), the protagonist of the novel, spent three and half years (4 April 1992 – 13 August 1995) in a remote farm in the Saudi Arabian desert. Najeeb Muhammed is a real life character.
 Hakeem is a young man, who got trapped under another Arab and lives a life similar to Najeeb. He joins Najeeb to elope from the desert, however, surrenders before death due to hunger and thirst in their perilous journey through the Arabian Desert. 
 Ibrahim Khadiri
 Arab owner
 Hameed
 Kunjikka
 Sainu

Inspiration
Recounting his meeting with the real-life Najeeb, Benyamin reminisces:
 
 
The reluctant Najeeb who wanted to forget his past had to be coaxed to recount his story.

Translations 
The original book was published by Green Books Private Limited, Thrissur on 15 July 2008. The English translation of the novel for Penguin Books was carried out by Joseph Koyippally, a literature professor in the Central University of Kerala.

Other translations

The translations into Kannada and Hindi are due for release.

Film adaptation 

Director Blessy had announced that he would be making a film based on the book, titled Aadujeevitham. However, the author noted, "We are still in the discussion stage. Our plans for a film had to be postponed when we realised that its production cost would not be feasible for a Malayalam film. Now we are planning something on a larger scale and Prithviraj Sukumaran will play Najeeb's role. "

However, in late 2017, Blessy had confirmed the eponymous film adaptation of the book as a Malayalam film. After months of speculation, in January 2018 composer A. R. Rahman confirmed in a press conference that he is making a comeback to Malayalam cinema as a composer with the film.

See also 
 Arabikkatha
 Gaddama

References

External links 
 Goat Days at Penguin Books official website
 Buy Aadujeevitham Malayalam Book at Pusthakam.net website
 ബെന്യാമിന്റെ ആടു ജീവിതം അറബിയിലേക്ക് at arabianewspaper.com Malayalam online news

Human rights abuses in Saudi Arabia
Novels about slavery
Malayalam novels
2008 Indian novels
Novels set in Saudi Arabia
Kerala Sahitya Akademi Award-winning works
Articles containing video clips